Mahnke Peak is a  mountain in Mendocino County, California.

Location

Mahnke Peak is in Mendocino County, California, in the Mayacamas Mountains of the northern California Coast Ranges.
It is just south of the Mendocino County–Lake County boundary.

The Köppen climate classification is Csb : Warm-summer Mediterranean climate.
The mountain is named for John Christian Christof Mahnke (1858–1939) and his family, who ran several hundred head of angora goats on this peak for 70 years.
There is a small building on top of the peak which has an excellent view of the power plants of The Geysers geothermal field.

Hydrology

The peak borders the Russian River watershed to the west.
To the northwest Hoil Creek joins Tyler Creek, a tributary of Pieta Creek, which in turn is a tributary of Russian River.
Another stream draining the peak is Hummingbird Creek, which flows south to Squaw Creek, a tributary of Big Sulphur Creek, which is also a tributary of Russian River to the west.

Dimensions

Notes

Sources

Mountains of Lake County, California